The Ghanaian anti-LGBT bill (or formally Promotion of Proper Human Sexual Rights and Ghanaian Family Values Bill) is a proposed law in Ghana that would introduce wide-ranging restrictions on LGBT+ rights.

Background 

Homosexuality in Ghana was first criminalised under the Offences Against the Person Act 1861, when Ghana was under British rule. The Act was implemented in all British colonies. Following independence, Section 104 of the Ghanaian Criminal Code of 1960 criminalised "unnatural carnal knowledge."

Summary 
The bill is 36 pages long and describes its objective as "to provide for proper human sexual rights and Ghanaian family values; proscribe LGBTQ+ and related activities; proscribe propaganda of, advocacy for or promotion of LGBTTQQIAAP+ and related activities; provide for the protection of and support for children, persons who are victims or accused of LGBTTQQIAAP+ and related activities and other persons; and related matters."

Among the provisions of the bill are:
 3 to 5 years of imprisonment for engaging in same-sex intercourse;
 5 to 10 years of imprisonment for anyone who produces, procures, or distributes material deemed to be promoting LGBT+ activities;
 A requirement for citizens and institutions to "promote and protect proper human sexual rights and Ghanaian family values";
 6 months to 1 year imprisonment for a "public show of amorous relations" between people of the same sex; 
 6 months to 1 year imprisonment for a "public show of amorous relations " with someone who has undergone gender reassignment or who cross-dresses;   
 A ban on providing trans healthcare; 
 Forced disbanding of all LGBT+ associations in Ghana, along with 6 to 10 years of imprisonment for anyone taking part in such an association; 
 A ban on sponsoring LGBT+ groups;    
 A clause that holds owners of digital platforms or physical premises in which LGBT+ groups organise equally guilty of promoting LGBT+ activities; 
 Prohibition of same-sex marriage;
 Prohibition of marriage to people who have undergone gender reassignment; 
 6 to 10 years of imprisonment for anyone who teaches children about LGBT+ activities or teaches that there are more genders than the gender binary;   
 A ban on adoption and fostering for LGBT+ potential parents; 
 6 months to 3 years imprisonment for anyone who harasses someone accused of being LGBT+;   
 A clause allowing the government to identify questioning and intersex people and intervene, such as through therapy or through medical treatment to align an intersex person with the gender binary;   
 A clause allowing the government to extradite people convicted under the bill.

Legislative history 
In mid-June 2021, Speaker of the Parliament of Ghana Alban Bagbin stated that LGBT+ rights "should not be encouraged or accepted by our society" and that "urgent actions are being taken to pass a law to eventually nip the activities of [LGBT+] groups in the bud." Later that month, eight MPs in the Parliament proposed the Promotion of Proper Human Sexual Rights and Ghanaian Family Values Bill 2021. The eight MPs were Sam Nartey George, Della Sowah, Emmanuel Kwasi Bedzrah, Alhassan Suhuyini, Rita Naa Odoley Sowah, Helen Ntoso, and Rockson-Nelson Dafeamekpor, all of the National Democratic Congress, as well as John Ntim Fordjour of the New Patriotic Party. On 1 July, Alban Bagbin stated that he expected the law to be passed within six months, telling a prayer meeting of Ghanaian MPs that "the LGBT+ pandemic is worse than COVID-19."

On 2 August 2021, the bill passed its first reading in the Ghanaian Parliament, being referred to the Committee on Constitutional, Legal and Parliamentary Affairs.

On 13 October 2021, majority leader in the Parliament Osei Kyei Mensah Bonsu said that the Parliament would ensure "careful balance" in assessing the bill.

On 5 November 2021, deputy majority leader Alexander Kwamina Afenyo-Markin announced that Constitutional, Legal and Parliamentary Affairs Committee would begin hearing petitions in a week, estimating that "we are looking at 15 weeks for the hearings to be done."

On 12 November 2021, public hearings began on the bill in the Parliament of Ghana. On the first day of hearings, Henry Kwasi Prempeh of the Ghana Centre for Democratic Development spoke against the bill, saying that "merely because you see yourself as part of a momentary majority, does not entitle you to impose your will on even one individual in the society." Kyeremeh Atuahene of the Ghana AIDS Commission said that the bill risked criminalising anti-HIV/AIDS efforts in the country, and also pushing back against donor funding.

On 30 November 2021, Akwasi Osei of the Mental Health Authority Ghana spoke in support of the bill, saying that homosexuality was abnormal and that a majority of LGBT+ people in Ghana claimed to be queer because of peer pressure. That day, Commissioner of Human Rights and Administrative Justice of Ghana Joseph Whittal told the Parliament to "be careful on the bill." saying that Commission was neither for nor against the bill but that the bill risked putting advocates for human rights in danger of criminal prosecution.

On 6 December 2021, Moses Foh-Amoaning of the National Coalition for Proper Human Sexual Rights and Family Values spoke in support of the bill, saying LGBT+ people were "not well, and the law gives [health authorities] the power to restrain such people."

Reception

Domestic reactions 
Ghanaian human rights NGO Rightify Ghana called the bill "an attack on our fundamental human rights" stating that it would "steal our freedoms of speech and expression, right to privacy, freedoms of association and assembly, as well as rights to healthcare, employment, housing and others." The Humanist Association of Ghana called the bill an attempt "to further oppress the LGBTQI+ community as well as allies," stating that Ghana's international reputation "has taken a big hit." Journalist Nana Ama Agyemang Asante said that she was "stunned by the contents, the crudeness of the language, and the cruelty behind [the bill]." On 4 October, 17 prominent Ghanaians co-signed a statement against the bill.

On 24 October 2021, Ghanaian president Nana Akufo-Addo called for civil discussion on the bill, stating that "we will recognise the need for us to be tolerant of each other when there are opposing views. I think it will be a credit to Ghananian democracy if this matter is handled in the correct manner." On 28 October, Yaw Boadu-Ayeboafoh, chairman of the National Media Commission, stated that "sometimes sentiments are more than rationalism in the way that the debate goes" in reference to the bill.

Among Ghanaian political parties, the New Patriotic Party, the People's National Convention, the National Democratic Congress, the Convention People's Party, the National Democratic Party, and the All People's Congress announced support for bill. The Liberal Party of Ghana announced opposition to the bill.

Osagyefo Agyeman Badu II, President of Bono Regional House of Chiefs, stated that "chiefs in this country are strongly behind [the bill]" and threatened to "storm parliament with 10 000 people" if the bill was not passed.

Bishop of Asante Mampong and Archbishop for the Church of the Internal Province of Ghana, the Province of West Africa Cyril Kobina Ben-Smith said that the Anglican Church in Ghana would "do anything within our powers and mandate to ensure that the bill comes into fruition" and that church considered "LGBT+ as unrighteousness in the sight of God."

On 5 October 2021, the Christian Council of Ghana and the Ghana Pentecostal and Charismatic Council released a joint statement supporting the bill, saying that being LGBT+ was "alien to the Ghanaian culture and family value system, and as such, the citizens of this nation cannot accept it." Sheikh Aremeyaw Shaibu, spokesperson for the Chief Imam of Ghana, said that "this is the time to make the laws more stringent because of the force with which those activities are being promoted in our country" and saying that MPs supporting the bill "must never give up." The Ghana Catholic Bishops Conference, the Presbyterian Church of Ghana, and the Coalition of Muslim Organisations, Ghana also announced support for the bill.

In June 2022, after reactions by proponents of the bill, billboards in Accra and Tamale were pulled down for  illegally promoting LGBTQ activities.Sam George, one of the proponents of the bill, called the erection of the billboards an action against the constitution of Ghana.

International reactions 
The Office of the United Nations High Commissioner for Human Rights said that "adopting the legislation in its current or any partial form would be tantamount to a violation of a number of human rights standards, including the absolute prohibition of torture."

Human Rights Watch LGBT+ director Graeme Reid said the bill was "so onerous it beggars belief" and that it "represents a witch-hunt against LGBT people in Ghana." Amnesty International called for the Ghanaian Parliament to "immediately withdraw" the bill, saying that it "gravely contravenes the principles of equality and non-discrimination, the rights to freedom of expression, association and privacy, and the prohibition of torture enshrined in the 1992 Constitution of Ghana and international human rights treaties ratified by the country."

Archbishop Emeritus of Cape Town Desmond Tutu compared the bill to apartheid, saying that "I’m absolutely, utterly and completely certain that God wouldn’t be homophobic." Archbishop of York Stephen Cottrell and Bishop of London Sarah Mullally condemned the bill. Archbishop of Canterbury Justin Welby initially said he was "gravely concerned" by the bill, however later apologised for the statement, saying that he had "no authority over the Church of Ghana, nor would I want any."

The bill has been linked by several commentators to the World Congress of Families, an American conservative Christian organisation designated by the Southern Poverty Law Center as anti-LGBT hate group. In 2019, the WCF had held a conference in Accra, where delegates had proposed forming legal teams to bring constitutional attacks on LGBT+ rights in Ghana.

See also 
 2021 Ghana gay arrests
 Hungarian anti-LGBT law
 Russian gay propaganda law
 Sexual Offenses Bill, 2019

References 

Law of Ghana
Proposed laws
LGBT in Ghana
LGBT-related legislation
Homophobia
Censorship of LGBT issues